The Amco was an American automobile manufactured primarily for the export market, designed by D.M. Eller and built by American Motors, Inc. of New York City from 1917 to 1922.  

Between 1919 and 1920 the company produced cars that had left- or right-hand steering optional. The cars were marketed in a single color: beige. Each carried a radiator specially designed for tropical climates.

References

External links
Entry at american-automobiles.com

Vintage vehicles
Defunct motor vehicle manufacturers of the United States
Motor vehicle manufacturers based in New York (state)